Diatali is a village in Kalaskati Union of Bakerganj Upazila, Barisal District in the Barisal Division of southern-central Bangladesh.

References

Populated places in Barisal District